The International Franz Liszt Piano Competition ("Liszt Competition") is an international piano competition. It is a member of the World Federation of International Music Competitions.

The Competition is held in Utrecht in the Netherlands. It first took place in 1986, one hundred years after the death of Franz Liszt.

Each time the Liszt Competition has been held it has seen over two hundred selected participants. Since 2014, only 14 contestants are selected after the International Selection Rounds hosted in USA, Asia and Europe.

List of Prizewinners
Source Official webpage

See also
 List of classical music competitions

References

 International Franz Liszt Piano Competition – official page
 World Federation of International Music Competitions
 Directory of International Piano Competitions
Piano Competitions & Music Competitions  at Bakitone International

 
Classical music awards
Recurring events established in 1986